True Obsessions is the fourth studio album by guitarist Marty Friedman, released on April 17, 1996 through Toshiba EMI (Japan) and October 8, 1996 through Shrapnel Records (United States). It was also the last to feature Nick Menza on drums.

Track listing

Personnel

Marty Friedman – guitar, synthesizer, production
Stanley Rose – vocals
Brian BecVar – keyboard, piano
Nick Menza – drums
Greg Bissonette – drums ("Last September", "Intoxicated", "Hands of Time")
Carmine Appice – drums ("Shine on Me", "Live and Learn)"
Tony Franklin – bass
Jimmy Haslip – bass ("Intoxicated")
Alex Wilkinson – orchestral instrumentation, percussion
Tom Gattis – background vocals
Steve Fontano – engineering, mixing, production
Zach Blackstone – mixing
Mike Tacci – mixing
Ryan Dorn – engineering
Brian Kinkel – engineering
Billy Moss – engineering
Larry Jacobson – engineering
Wally Traugott – mastering

References

External links
Story Behind The Song - True Obsessions at martyfriedman.com
In Review: Marty Friedman "True Obsessions" at Guitar Nine Records

Marty Friedman albums
1996 albums
EMI Records albums
Shrapnel Records albums